Joshua Ramus (born August 11, 1969) is founding principal of REX, an architecture and design firm based in New York City, whose name signifies a re-appraisal (RE) of architecture (X).

His current projects include The Ronald O. Perelman Performing Arts Center at the World Trade Center in New York; the Mercedes-Benz Future Lab and Museum in Stuttgart; the Lindemann Performing Arts Center; 2050 M Street, a premium office building in Washington, DC that will host CBS's Washington Bureau; PERTH+, a 60-story mixed-use tower in Western Australia; and the Necklace Residence on Long Island. In the fall of 2017, REX completed the transformation of Five Manhattan West, the re-cladding and interior renovation of a 160,000 m2 exemplar of late-Brutalism straddling Penn Station's rail yard in New York City.

Work
PERTH+, Perth Australia (ongoing)
Vakko Headquarters and Power Media Center (2010), Istanbul, Turkey
 AT&T Performing Arts Center's Dee and Charles Wyly Theatre (2009), Dallas, Texas
Munch Museum (2009), Oslo, Norway
Munch Area Master Plan (2009), Oslo, Norway
Kortrijk LLLibrary (2009), Kortrijk, Belgium
Kunsthaus Zurich Extension Competition (2009), Zurich, Switzerland
Madison Avenue (Doll)House for the Calvin Klein Collection storefront on Madison Avenue (2008), New York, New York
Forward Residence for the Forward Building (2008), New York, New York
Yongsan Experiment (2008), Seoul, Korea
Vestbane (2007), Oslo, Norway
Governors Island Competition (2007), New York, New York
Walter & Leonore Annenberg Center for Information Science and Technology at the California Institute of Technology (2006) Pasadena, California
Seattle Central Library (2004), Seattle, Washington
Guggenheim-Hermitage Museum and Guggenheim Las Vegas Museum (2001) Las Vegas, Nevada

References 

20th-century American architects
Harvard Graduate School of Design alumni
1969 births
Living people
Yale University alumni
21st-century American architects